Jung Jin-young (born November 18, 1991), professionally known as  Jinyoung, is a South Korean singer, songwriter, record producer, and actor. He was a member of boy group B1A4, being its former leader. He is currently managed by BB Entertainment. He has also gained recognition with the television series Love in the Moonlight (2016) and Police University (2021).

Career

2011–2018: B1A4 

Jung was discovered on Cyworld through a photo of himself posted on the website. He trained for roughly two years on singing, composing and acting before joining B1A4.

Jung was the first member of B1A4 revealed to the public on April 11, 2011. The group made their debut stage on April 23, 2011, on MBC's Show! Music Core.

On June 30, 2018, WM Entertainment confirmed that Jung and Baro had left the agency following the end of their contracts. Their activities with the group remain in discussion. In November 16, WM Entertainment has announced that Jung and Baro will be leaving the agency, with the remaining three members – CNU, Sandeul, and Gongchan – to continue promoting as B1A4.

Solo career
Jung first gained attention for his composing skills with B1A4's comeback title track, "Baby I'm Sorry" (2012), where he was praised by musical professionals.

In 2013, he made his acting debut in tvN's drama She is Wow. The following year, he made his film debut in Miss Granny. He also wrote the ending song of the movie.

In 2015, he starred in Mnet's musical drama Persevere, Goo Hae-ra, where he drew praise for his acting. Later that year, he starred in the Hong sisters' romantic comedy drama Warm and Cozy.

Jung took part in producing the songs "In the Same Place" and "When Cherry Blossoms Fade" for Mnet's 2016 reality survival program Produce 101. This was the first time he composed songs for a girl group, and he received praise for his capabilities and versatility as a composer. He was named the "No.1 solo composer" of 2016. The same year, he starred in KBS's youth historical drama Love in the Moonlight. The drama was a hit and led to increased recognition for Jung as an actor. Jung reunited with Moonlight co-star Chae Soo-bin a year later in the two-episode drama special If We Were a Season (2017).

In October 2017, it was confirmed that Jung would star in upcoming body-swap comedy film The Dude in Me. The film was released in January 2019.

In 2018, Jung was cast in Netflix's youth romance drama My First First Love and the web drama Wind-Bell in October of the same year.

Also, in 2018, a book named "K-pop makers" about the k-pop musicians market-movers was released. Jung was featured as one of the eight hidden gems and hidden producers of South Korea, together with Big Hit Entertainment Pdogg, SM Entertainment London Noise, Mystic Story Postino, CNBLUE Jong Yong-hwa, Urban Zakapa Kwon Soon-il and Super Freak Records Jinbo.

On June 20, 2019, Jung enlisted in the military service and he returned to the industry on April 9, 2021.  His first comeback drama was a well-received drama known as Police University (2021) which brought KBS drama viewership ratings back to a high of 8.5% at its highest and an average of 6.5% in the Mon-Tue 9:30 pm (KST) timeslot after the predecessor had a viewership rate hovering around 1–2%.

On June 23, 2022, Jung launched his YouTube Channel and released a teaser video for Everything that inspires me, announcing that he would be releasing a series of no copyright music periodically so that people working in the creative works industry can use his music freely.  Following that on June 25, 2022, he released It was a First Love, the first No Copyright Sound track.

Discography

Soundtrack appearances

As producer / songwriter

B1A4

Jinyoung is known for composing several title tracks and songs for B1A4's albums.

Others / Producer / Song-writer / Composer

Filmography

Film

Television series

Web series

Television shows and MC Events

Web shows

Awards and nominations

References

External links

 Official website 

 
 

1991 births
Living people
People from Chungju
Singers from Seoul
21st-century South Korean male actors
South Korean male idols
South Korean male singers
South Korean pop singers
South Korean male film actors
South Korean male television actors
South Korean singer-songwriters
South Korean record producers
B1A4 members
WM Entertainment artists
South Korean male singer-songwriters
Cheongju University alumni